The Courageous class consisted of three battlecruisers known as "large light cruisers" built for the Royal Navy during the First World War. The class was nominally designed to support the Baltic Project, a plan by Admiral of the Fleet Lord Fisher that was intended to land troops on the German Baltic Coast. Ships of this class were fast but very lightly armoured, with only a few heavy guns. They were given a shallow draught, in part to allow them to operate in the shallow waters of the Baltic but also reflecting experience gained earlier in the war. To maximize their speed, the Courageous-class battlecruisers were the first capital ships of the Royal Navy to use geared steam turbines and small-tube boilers.

They participated in the Second Battle of Heligoland Bight in November 1917 and were present when the High Seas Fleet surrendered a year later. Their half-sister  was designed with a pair of  guns, the largest guns ever fitted on a ship of the Royal Navy, but was modified during construction to take a flying-off deck and hangar in lieu of her forward turret and barbette. After some patrols in the North Sea, her rear turret was removed and another flight deck added. Her aircraft attacked the Zeppelin sheds during the Tondern raid in July 1918.

All three ships were laid up after the war, but were rebuilt into the Courageous-class aircraft carrier during the 1920s. Glorious and Courageous were sunk early in the Second World War and Furious was sold for scrap in 1948.

Design and description 

The first two Courageous-class battlecruisers were designed in 1915 to meet a set of requirements laid down by the First Sea Lord, Admiral Fisher, with his Baltic Project in mind. They were to be large enough to ensure that they could maintain their speed in heavy weather, have a powerful armament and a speed of at least  to allow them to outrun enemy light cruisers. Shallow draught was of the utmost importance and all other factors were to be subordinated to this. The Director of Naval Construction (DNC), Sir Eustace Tennyson-d'Eyncourt, responded on 23 February 1915 with a smaller version of the s with one less gun turret and reduced armour protection. The Chancellor of the Exchequer had forbidden any further construction of ships larger than light cruisers in 1915, so Fisher designated the ships as large light cruisers to evade this prohibition. If this restriction had not been in place, the ships would have been built as improved versions of the preceding Renown class. The two ships were laid down a few months later under a veil of secrecy, so they became known in the Royal Navy as "Lord Fisher's hush-hush cruisers" and their odd design also earned them the nickname of the Outrageous class.

Their half-sister Furious was designed a few months later to meet a revised requirement specifying an armament of two BL 18-inch Mk I guns, the largest guns ever fitted on a Royal Navy ship, in single turrets with the ability to use twin  gun turrets if the 18-inch guns were unsatisfactory. Gunnery experts criticized this decision because the long time between salvoes would make spotting corrections useless and reduce the rate of fire and thus the probability of a direct hit. Her secondary armament was upgraded to BL  Mk I guns, rather than the  guns used by the first two ships, to compensate for the weakness of the two main guns against fast-moving targets like destroyers. Her displacement and beam were increased over that of her half-sisters with slightly less draught.

The Baltic Project was only one justification for the ships.  Admiral Fisher wrote in a letter to the DNC on 16 March 1915: "I've told the First Lord that the more that I consider the qualities of your design of the Big Light Battle Cruisers, the more that I am impressed by its exceeding excellence and simplicity—all the three vital requisites of gunpower, speed and draught so well balanced!" In fact they could be considered the epitome of Fisher's belief in the paramount importance of speed over everything else. Fisher's adherence to this principle is highlighted in a letter he wrote to Churchill concerning the battleships of the 1912–13 Naval Estimates. In the letter, dated April 1912, Fisher stated: "There must be sacrifice of armour ... There must be further VERY GREAT INCREASE IN SPEED ... your speed must vastly exceed [that of] your possible enemy!"

Fisher's desire for a shallow draught was not merely based on the need to allow for inshore operations; ships tended to operate closer to deep load than anticipated and were often found lacking in freeboard, reserve buoyancy and safety against underwater attack. This experience led the DNC to reconsider the proportions of the hull to rectify the problems identified thus far. The Courageous-class ships were the first products of that re-evaluation.

General characteristics 

Propulsion 
To save weight and space the Courageous-class ships were the first large warships in the Royal Navy to have geared steam turbines and small-tube boilers despite the latter's significantly heavier maintenance requirements. Furthermore, to save design time, the turbine installation used in the light cruiser , the navy's first cruiser with geared turbines, was simply doubled. The Parsons turbines were arranged in two engine rooms and each of the turbines drove one of the four propeller shafts. The turbines were powered by eighteen Yarrow boilers equally divided among three boiler rooms.

Armament 
The Courageous-class ships mounted four BL 15-inch Mark I guns in two twin hydraulically powered Mark I* turrets, one each fore (designated the 'A' turrets) and aft (the 'Y' turrets). These turrets were originally intended for a  that was canceled shortly after the war began. The guns could be depressed to −3° and elevated to 20°; they could be loaded at any angle up to 20°, although loading at high angles tended to slow the gun's return to battery (firing position). The ships carried 120 shells per gun.

The Courageous-class ships were designed with 18 BL 4-inch Mark IX guns, fitted in six triple mounts. These were manually powered and quite cumbersome in use as they required a crew of thirty-two men to load and train the guns. The gun's rate of fire was only 10 to 12 rounds per minute as the loaders kept getting in each other's way. They had a maximum depression of −10° and a maximum elevation of 30°. The ships carried 120 rounds for each gun.

Each ship mounted a pair of QF 3 inch 20 cwt anti-aircraft guns on single high-angle Mark II mountings. These were mounted abreast the mainmast in the Courageous-class ships and before the funnel on Furious. The gun had a maximum depression of 10° and a maximum elevation of 90°. All three ships carried ten torpedoes and mounted two  submerged side-loading torpedo tubes fitted near 'A' turret. They were loaded and traversed by hydraulic power, but fired by compressed air.

The 18-inch BL Mark I gun carried by Furious was derived from the 15-inch Mark I gun used in her half-sisters. It was intended to be mounted in two single-gun turrets derived from the twin-gun 15-inch Mark I/N turret, and her barbettes were designed to accommodate either turret in case problems arose with the 18-inch gun's development, but only one turret was actually fitted. The gun could depress to −3° and elevate to a maximum of 30°. It could fire one round per minute and the ship carried sixty rounds of ammunition.

Furiouss secondary armament consisted of 11 BL 5.5-inch Mk I guns. The guns had a maximum elevation of 25° on their pivot mounts.

Fire control 
The main guns of the Courageous-class ships could be controlled from either of the two fire-control directors. The primary director was mounted above the conning tower in an armoured hood and the other was in the fore-top on the foremast. The secondary armament was also director-controlled. Each turret was provided with a  rangefinder in an armoured housing on the turret roof. The fore-top was equipped with a  rangefinder as was the torpedo control tower above the rear superstructure. The anti-aircraft guns were controlled by a simple  rangefinder mounted on the aft superstructure.

Protection 
Unlike on other British battlecruisers, the bulk of the armour of the Courageous-class ships was made from high-tensile steel, a type of steel used structurally in other ships. Their waterline belt consisted of  covered by a  skin. It ran from barbette to barbette with a one-inch extension forward to the two-inch forward bulkhead well short of the bow. From the forward barbette a three-inch bulkhead extended out to the ship's side between the upper and lower decks and a comparable bulkhead was in place at the rear barbette as well. After the loss of three battlecruisers to magazine explosions during the Battle of Jutland,  of extra protection was added to the deck around the magazines.

The turrets, barbettes and conning tower were made from Krupp cemented armour. The primary fire-control director atop the conning tower was protected by an armoured hood. The face of the hood was six inches thick, its sides were two inches thick and its roof was protected by three inches of armour. A communications tube with three-inch sides ran from the conning tower down to the lower conning position on the main deck.

All three ships were fitted with a shallow anti-torpedo bulge integral to the hull which was intended to explode the torpedo before it hit the hull proper and vent the underwater explosion to the surface rather than into the ship. However, later testing proved that it was not deep enough to accomplish its task as it lacked the layers of empty and full compartments that were necessary to absorb the force of the explosion.

Ships

Service 
During her sea trials in November 1916 off the River Tyne, Courageous sustained structural damage while running at full speed in a rough head sea. The forecastle deck was deeply buckled in three places between the breakwater and the forward turret. In addition, the side plating was visibly buckled between the forecastle and upper decks. Water had entered the submerged torpedo room and rivets had sheared in the vertical flange of the angle iron securing the deck armour in place. The exact cause remains uncertain, but Courageous received  of stiffening in response; Glorious did not receive her stiffening until 1918. Courageous also was temporarily fitted as a minelayer in April 1917, but never actually laid any mines. In mid-1917 both ships received a dozen torpedo tubes in pairs: one mount on each side of the mainmast on the upper deck and two mounts on each side of the rear turret on the quarterdeck. Courageous and Glorious served together throughout the war. Both ships were initially assigned to the 3rd Light Cruiser Squadron and later reconstituted the 1st Cruiser Squadron (CS).

Even as she was being built, Furious was modified with a large hangar capable of housing ten aircraft on her forecastle replacing the forward turret. A 160-foot (49 m) flight deck was built along its roof. Aircraft were flown off and, less successfully, landed on this deck. Although the aft turret was fitted and the gun trialled, it was not long before Furious returned to her builders for further modifications. In November 1917 the rear turret was replaced by a 300-foot (91 m) deck for landing aircraft over another hangar. Her funnel and superstructure remained intact, with a narrow strip of decking around them to connect the fore and aft flight decks. Turbulence from the funnel and superstructure was severe enough that only three landing attempts were successful before further attempts were forbidden. Her 18-inch guns were reused on the  monitors  and  during the war.

All three ships were in the 1st CS of which Courageous was flagship when the Admiralty received word of German ship movements on 16 October 1917, possibly indicating some sort of raid. Admiral Beatty, commander of the Grand Fleet, ordered most of his light cruisers and destroyers to sea in an effort to locate the enemy ships. Furious was detached from the 1st CS and ordered to sweep along the 56th parallel as far as 4° East and to return before dark. The other two ships were not initially ordered to sea, but were sent to reinforce the 2nd Light Cruiser Squadron patrolling the central part of the North Sea later that day. Two German  light cruisers managed to slip through the gaps in the British patrols and destroyed a convoy headed to Scandinavia during the morning of 17 October, but no word was received of the engagement until that afternoon. The 1st CS was ordered to attempt to intercept the German ships, but they proved to be too fast and the British ships were unsuccessful.

Second Battle of Heligoland Bight 

Over the course of 1917 the Admiralty was becoming more concerned about German efforts in the North Sea to sweep paths through the British-laid minefields intended to restrict the actions of the High Seas Fleet and German submarines. A preliminary raid on German minesweeping forces on 31 October by light forces destroyed ten small ships and the Admiralty decided on a larger operation to destroy the minesweepers and their escorting light cruisers. Based on intelligence reports the Admiralty decided on 17 November 1917 to allocate two light cruiser squadrons, the 1st CS covered by the reinforced 1st Battlecruiser Squadron and, more distantly, the battleships of the 1st Battle Squadron to the operation.

The German ships, four light cruisers of II Scouting Force, eight destroyers, three divisions of minesweepers, eight Sperrbrechers (cork-filled trawlers, used to detonate mines without sinking) and two trawlers to mark the swept route, were spotted at 7:30 a.m., silhouetted by the rising sun. Courageous and the light cruiser  opened fire with their forward guns seven minutes later. The Germans responded by laying an effective smoke screen. The British continued in pursuit, but lost track of most of the smaller ships in the smoke and concentrated fire on the light cruisers as opportunity permitted. At 8:33 the left-hand gun in Gloriouss forward turret was wrecked when a shell detonated inside the gun barrel. At 9:30 the 1st CS broke off their pursuit so they would not enter a minefield marked on their maps; the ships turned south, playing no further role in the battle. The German ships had too much of a lead to be caught by the British ships before they had to turn to avoid the minefield.

Both ships had taken minor damage from their own muzzle blasts, and Glorious required five days of repairs. Courageous fired 92 rounds of 15-inch while Glorious fired 57, scoring only the single hit on Pillau between them. They also fired 180 and 213 four-inch shells respectively. Courageouss mine fittings were removed after the battle and both ships received flying-off platforms on top of their turrets in 1918. A Sopwith Camel was carried on the rear turret and a Sopwith 1½ Strutter on the forward turret.

Furious was recommissioned on 15 March 1918 and her embarked aircraft were used on anti-Zeppelin patrols in the North Sea after May. In July 1918 she flew off seven Sopwith Camels which participated in the Tondern raid, attacking the Zeppelin sheds at Tondern with moderate success. All three ships were present at the surrender of the German fleet on 21 November 1918.

Post-war history 

Courageous was reduced to reserve at Rosyth on 1 February 1919 before being assigned to the Gunnery School at Devonport the following year as a turret drill ship. She became flagship of the Rear-Admiral Commanding the Reserve at Devonport in March 1920. Glorious was also reduced to reserve at Rosyth on 1 February and served as a turret-drill ship, but succeeded her sister as flagship between 1921 and 1922. Furious was placed in reserve 21 November 1919 before beginning reconstruction as an aircraft carrier in 1921.

The Washington Naval Treaty of 1922 required the signatory nations to severely curtail their plans for new warships and scrap many existing warships to meet its tonnage limits. Each ship was reconstructed with a full-length flight deck during the 1920s.

As the first large, or "fleet", carrier completed by the Royal Navy, Furious was extensively used to evaluate aircraft handling and landing procedures, including the first ever carrier night-landing in 1926. Courageous became the first warship lost by the Royal Navy in the Second World War II when she was torpedoed in September 1939. Furious spent the first months of the war hunting for German raiders and escorting convoys before she began to support British forces in Norway. She spent most of 1940 in Norwegian waters making attacks on German installations and shipping, and most of 1941 ferrying aircraft to West Africa, Gibraltar and Malta before refitting in the United States. She ferried aircraft to Malta during 1942 and provided air support to British forces during Operation Torch. She was worn out by late 1944 and was reduced to reserve in September before being decommissioned the following year. Furious was sold in 1948 for scrap.

Notes

Footnotes

References

External links 

 Dreadnought Project Technical material on the weaponry and fire control for the ships
 Photo gallery of Courageous and Glorious
 Photo gallery for Furious as both battlecruiser and aircraft carrier

Battlecruiser classes
Ship classes of the Royal Navy